MN+ is an Indian  English Movie channel which is part of the Times Network.  It was launched on 29 Jun 2015. The channel is owned by the Bennett, Coleman and Co. Ltd.

See also
 Movies Now
 Romedy Now

References

External links

Movie channels in India
Television channels and stations established in 2015
English-language television stations in India
Television channels of The Times Group
2015 establishments in Maharashtra